Sigolsheim (Alsatian: Sìjelse) is a former commune in the Haut-Rhin department in north-eastern France. On 1 January 2016, it was merged into the new commune Kaysersberg Vignoble.

Children previously attended school in the École élémentaire publique intercommunale which had preschool (maternelle) and elementary.

Population

See also
 Communes of the Haut-Rhin department

References

Former communes of Haut-Rhin